In digital geometry, a cutting sequence is a sequence of symbols whose elements correspond to the individual grid lines crossed ("cut") as a curve crosses a square grid.

Sturmian words are a special case of cutting sequences where the curves are straight lines of irrational slope.

References 
Notes

Bibliography
 

Discrete mathematics
Digital geometry
Sequences and series